The City of Glasgow Chorus  is one of Glasgow’s leading choirs. Our members are dedicated and talented singers performing with professional musicians to a very high standard. Founded in 1983 by Graham Taylor MBE, we now sing under the baton of Music Director Paul Keohone. 

The Chorus is one of the biggest independent choral groups in the West of Scotland and a significant player in Scotland’s arts environment. We sing a wide range of musical genres and are committed to performing less familiar pieces as well as popular and well-loved choral works.

As well as performing at our own promoted concerts we are available for hire for corporate events, recording sessions, and personal celebrations.

The City of Glasgow Chorus Trust is a Company limited by guarantee, with charitable status. It is registered in Scotland (113563), and its Registered Charity number is SC 004791.

Concert series
The Chorus performs a regular series of concerts each season. In recent years, these have included a string of lesser known works by very well known composers - Andrew Lloyd Webber’s Requiem, Verdi’s Four Sacred Pieces, Holst’s Choral Symphony, Mendelssohn’s Die Erste Walpurgisnacht, Malcolm Arnold’s The Return of Odysseus, Bruckner’s Mass in F minor and Szymanowski’s Stabat Mater, as well as some of the more demanding parts of the repertoire including Walton's Belshazzar's Feast, Beethoven's Missa Solemnis, Berlioz's Grande Messe des Morts and Mahler’s Symphony No. 8 – the Symphony of a Thousand. In November 2018, the Chorus joined forces with the Leeds Festival Chorus for a performance of Britten’s War Requiem with the BBC Philharmonic in Leeds Town Hall.

The Chorus has recorded Scots songs with Iain Sutherland, performed and recorded Shaun Davey’s epic Celtic suite – The Pilgrim, taken part in the Star Wars World Tour with the Royal Philharmonic Concert Orchestra, backed Russell Watson and Sarah Brightman and appeared with Lesley Garrett in the televised Eurovision Dance Contest 2008 as the interval act. The Chorus appears regularly in concerts of West End and Broadway shows promoted by West End International.

International
Notable overseas performances include concerts in Notre Dame Cathedral in Chartres, a tour of the Czech Republic in 1996, where the Chorus performed the Prague premiere of William Walton’s oratorio, Belshazzar's Feast, with the Karlovy Vary Symphony Orchestra and in October 2013, as part of their 30th anniversary celebrations, the Chorus travelled to Poland for a week performing  in Krakow and Opole including a performance of Verdi's Requiem with the Opole Philharmonic Orchestra of Poland.

In 2016 the Chorus travelled to China performing Vaughan Williams’ A Sea Symphony in Beijing and Brahms’ German Requiem in Nanjing and Shanghai.

Recordings
The Chorus has made a number of recordings, the most recent of which is a recording of Choral Classics: Something Old, Something New made in the Caird Hall in Dundee, with organist David Hamilton, which was released in November 2014.

References

External links
Official homepage
Concert schedule
Contact details

Scottish choirs
Musical groups from Glasgow
Musical groups established in 1983